La Gitanilla may refer to:
 La Gitanilla, a short story contained in Miguel de Cervantes' Novelas ejemplares (The Exemplary Novels)
 The Bandits (ballet), a ballet based on Cervantes' story
 La gitanilla (1924 film), a 1924 film based on Cervantes' story
 La gitanilla (1940 film), a 1940 film based on Cervantes' story